Namtok Kaeng Song is a waterfall in the Wang Thong District of Phitsanulok Province in Thailand. It is on the Wang Thong River near kilometer 45 of Lomsak Road (Highway 12).

Gallery

References

External links
 White Fright Water
 Kaeng Song Cafe - Khek river rafting festival

Kaeng Song
Geography of Phitsanulok province
Tourist attractions in Phitsanulok province